Murder She Purred: A Mrs. Murphy Mystery is a 1998 television film, starring Ricki Lake and directed by Simon Wincer. The film aired as part of the anthology series The Wonderful World of Disney. It was based on Rita Mae Brown's novel series featuring a cat named Mrs. Murphy. The film was shot in Ontario, Canada and was aired by ABC on December 13, 1998.

Plot

Mrs. Murphy (a cat) and Tucker (a dog) join forces to investigate their new neighbor whom they believe had committed a crime.

Cast
 Ricki Lake as Mary Minor 'Harry' Haristeen 
 Linden Ashby as Dr. Blair Bainbridge
 Bruce McGill as Sheriff Rick
 Christina Pickles as Mim Sanburne
 Judith Scott as Coop
 Kari Coleman as Susan
 Blythe Danner as Mrs. Murphy (voice)
 Anthony Clark as Tucker (voice)
 Ed Begley Jr. as Fitz-Gilbert Hamilton

Reception
Ray Richmond from Variety magazine gave the film a very bad review, stating: "This installment of 'The Wonderful World of Disney,' based on the 'Mrs. Murphy' series of mystery novels penned by Rita Mae Brown, is pretty much as dumb as it gets, giving us a dog and a cat who solve crimes (Mrs. Murphy is the cat) and a starring role for Ricki Lake that makes her lowbrow daytime yakfest seem like 'Frontline' by comparison. Disney has been reduced to ripping off itself — or didn't anyone see 'Homeward Bound' and its sequel?".

References

External links
 
 

1998 television films
1998 films
Disney television films
Films shot in Ontario
Films directed by Simon Wincer
American television films
1990s mystery films
Films about cats
Films about dogs
American mystery films
1990s American films
ABC network original films